Eva (stylized as EVA) is a fictional character from the Metal Gear series. EVA is introduced in Metal Gear Solid 3: Snake Eater, and subsequently appears in Metal Gear Solid 4: Guns of the Patriots.

Appearances
According to her backstory, her character was born in Meridian, Idaho, on May 15, 1936. At some point in her childhood, prior to the advent of World War II, she, along with several other children across the world, was taken by the Philosophers secret world government conspiracy and raised in a joint U.S.-Soviet-Chinese facility, receiving spy training at one of the Philosophers "charm schools", so she could become a sleeper agent. As a result of this, she was indistinguishable from any other native-born American. She eventually joined The Second Department of the Chinese People's Liberation Army General Staff Headquarters, responsible for collecting military intelligence. There, she learned techniques such as "bandit shooting", a horizontal sweep using the Shanxi Type 17 handgun.

 first appears in Metal Gear Solid 3: Snake Eater, set in 1964, as a motorbike-riding supposed KGB female spy and a former NSA codebreaker who has defected to the Soviets along with ADAM. She uses her charm and good looks to win over the trust of Naked Snake and the Soviet enemies. EVA wants to kill Major Ocelot to avoid revealing her cover but is stopped by Snake. Later, EVA infiltrates Colonel Volgin's GRU base through the disguise , Sokolov's supposed lover, and assists Snake; "Tatyana" is tortured by Volgin with electric shocks in order to coerce the uncooperative Sokolov into completing the Shagohod's development and Volgin decided to have her "entertain". Throughout their respective missions, EVA and Snake began to develop romantic feelings for one another, but Snake was initially hesitant. She helps Snake destroy the Shagohod, kill Volgin and reach the Philosophers' Legacy so that she can later steal the treasure, even seeming to fall in love with Snake. At one point, EVA was nearly killed by the Colonel until The Boss volunteered to execute her personally; The Boss was actually trying to get her out of harm's way in reality. After the mission is completed, EVA and Snake have a one-night stand, but she could not bring herself to carry out the order of assassinating Snake, as she promised The Boss she would not. Instead, she flees with what she believes to be the Philosophers' Legacy (which was actually half taken by Ocelot for the CIA) as well as with intelligence data that lead to the breakthrough in the Chinese nuclear weapons program. Snake discovers a tape EVA has left revealing all her secrets. The epilogue prior to the credits goes on to state that EVA disappeared in Hanoi, North Vietnam, during the Vietnam War in 1968.

EVA reappears in Metal Gear Solid: Portable Ops as a recruitable character by completing a series of optional missions. In 1971, Big Boss and EVA reconciled after she was tracked down and rescued in Hanoi, and is invited to become a founding member of a shadow government along with Zero, Para-Medic (Dr. Clark), Sigint and Ocelot. At some point, she also discovered Ocelot's codename of ADAM, and the two reconciled. In 1972, EVA volunteered to serve as a surrogate mother in the Les Enfants Terribles project designed with Big Boss's "sons" to maintain an icon for their organization. She was originally implanted with eight clone fetuses, though six were intentionally aborted in order to encourage stronger growth in the remaining two, giving birth to Solid Snake and Liquid Snake. Despite Big Boss's disapproval and eventual defection in opposition to Zero's methods, EVA saw the "sons" as her own children.

EVA does not make a direct appearance in Metal Gear Solid: Peace Walker. She would remain in contact with Big Boss, passing on cassette tape recordings to the Militaires Sans Frontieres in 1974. In them, she detailed further information on The Boss's final mission, and the motivations behind her actions, having been entrusted to pass this on to Big Boss. These tapes were later supplied to Big Boss with no return address except with her name EVA, with Big Boss hesitantly explaining that she was an "old acquaintance".

It is revealed that she was fired from her job as a spy after she failed a mission in the previous game. She assists Old Snake in Eastern Europe. During a chase, EVA crashes her motorcycle and is impaired, seriously injuring her. When Liquid throws Big Boss's body into a fire, she attempts to save it but is nearly burned to death. Snake saved her from Liquid Ocelot's gunshot but the left side of her son's face gets badly burnt in the process. Although EVA initially appeared as if she died from injuries, it is later revealed that she died after coming into contact with the mutated FOXDIE virus carried in Snake's body.

In Metal Gear Solid V: The Phantom Pain, Zero tasked EVA to arrange Big Boss's confinement at a hospital in Cyprus after XOF's attack on Mother Base, revealing this to Ocelot.

EVA and Olga Gurlukovich's outfits can be used as costumes in Rumble Roses XX. EVA also makes a cameo appearance in Super Smash Bros. Brawl as an obtainable sticker, usable exclusively by Solid Snake in The Subspace Emissary.

Character design
EVA's character model was based by Hideo Kojima on a gravure idol he liked ("○○里", a possible reference to Chisato Morishita (森下 千里)), and her personality traits were inspired by Fujiko Mine from Lupin III. He also said: "On Eva's back are signs of torture. There are burn marks and cut marks, as well as some very old scars. The Colonel interrogated her with 'hentai play' (変態プレイ)." According to Kojima, EVA's character was disliked by the English voice actors for her personality. The defection of NSA codebreakers ADAM and EVA is based on a real-life incident in September 1960. EVA's alias, Tatyana, is the name of Tatiana Romanova, the Bond Girl in From Russia with Love. Although Laughing Octopus is the first character to use the word "fuck" in the English version of the series, it was first used by EVA in the Japanese version of Metal Gear Solid 3, when she says "fuck you" in English to Volgin (this line was changed to "go to hell" during localization).

Reception
Eva was well received by media. GameTrailers listed her at number eight among top-ten "gamer babes" in 2007 and Chip ranked her as the 14th-top "girl of gaming" in 2008. In 2007, Tom's Games included her among the 50 greatest female characters in video game history, proposing that she should be portrayed in a live-action adaptation by "Uma Thurman, because she's tall, blonde and built to kick ass." In 2011, 1UP.com instead proposed Gillian Jacobs, adding that "EVA proved herself as one of the games' smartest and craftiest characters, playing heroes and villains alike like oversized flesh fiddles." The scene between the "sexy" EVA, Snake, and Ocelot in MGS3 was ranked as fifth on the 2010 list of the most Metal Gear amazing cutscenes by Joystick Division.

Multiple publications noted the character for her sex appeal. EVA was chosen as "the perfect one to top the list" of the "PlayStation 2 babes" by Chris Reiter of Gaming Target in 2005 and ranked as the "43rd-hottest game babe" on all platforms by GameDaily in 2008. TF1 ranked her as 14th on their list of the sexiest video game characters to cosplay. In 2011, she was included on the list of the top 50 "video game hotties" by UGO, who called her "the epitome of a Bond girl when she shows up in MGS3." UGO later also included her on their 2012's list of 99 "hottest" fictional women in all media. That same year, GamerBliss ranked her as the third-sexiest "woman of gaming". PLAY put her undergarment in MGS3 as second on their list of top bras in games, commenting that few of them "can have been so gratuitously exposed as this one. Kojima truly is a genius."

References

Characters designed by Yoji Shinkawa
Female characters in video games
Fictional American diaspora
Fictional American people in video games
Fictional double agents
Fictional characters from Idaho
Fictional Chinese people in video games
Fictional members of secret societies
Metal Gear characters
Fictional secret agents and spies in video games
Fictional soldiers in video games
Video game characters introduced in 2004
Woman soldier and warrior characters in video games